The Kłodawa Salt Mine (Polish: Kopalnia Soli Kłodawa, KSK) is the biggest operating salt mine in Poland. It is located in Kłodawa, Koło County, Greater Poland Voivodship.

History 
In 1939 Polish professor Edward Walery Janczewski discovered geological layer of salt between Izbica Kujawska and Solca Wielka. It was 63 kilometres long and 4 kilometres wide. First drillings were done during German occupation of Poland and it was realized that Kłodawa is the best place to build a salt mine; it was also said that Izbica Kujawska had a good salt supply, but much smaller than Kłodawa.

The first two mineshafts (called Michał and Barbara, – named after the first director of the mine and Saint Barbara), were built from 1950 to 1954. The salt has been drilled since 1956. Until 1966 horses were the main way to drill the salt, in this year the electronic traction drive was built. The third mineshaft, located about 4 kilometres from Michał and Barbara, is named Chrobry (after first Polish king, Bolesław I Chrobry).

There is an underground touristic route in the mine, opened for visitors. It is scheduled to open the first underground sanatorium in Poland in Kłodawa Salt Mine.

On September 7, 2012 the salt mine suffered from a fire.

Salt 
There are different types of salt drilling in Kłodawa Salt Mine. All of them come from Zechstein. The salt in Kłodawa is the only salt in Poland which is colourful (pink and blue) and colourful elements in Wieliczka Salt Mine come from Kłodawa Salt Mine.

See also 
 Wieliczka Salt Mine
 Bochnia Salt Mine
 Kłodawa
 Khewra Salt Mine, in Punjab , Pakistan

External links 

 Official site

Salt mines in Poland
Underground mines in Poland
Tourist attractions in Poland
Koło County
Buildings and structures in Greater Poland Voivodeship